Chemical Reviews is peer-reviewed scientific journal published twice per month by the American Chemical Society. It publishes review articles on all aspects of chemistry. It was established in 1924 by William Albert Noyes (University of Illinois).  the editor-in-chief is Sharon Hammes-Schiffer.

Abstracting and indexing 
The journal is abstracted and indexed in Chemical Abstracts Service, CAB International, EBSCOhost, ProQuest, PubMed, Scopus, and the Science Citation Index. According to the Journal Citation Reports, the journal has a 2020 impact factor of 60.622.

See also 
 Accounts of Chemical Research

References

External links 
 

American Chemical Society academic journals
Review journals
Monthly journals
English-language journals
Publications established in 1924